Solomon Ehigiator Arase (born 21 June 1956) is a retired Nigerian police officer. He is currently the Chairman of the Nigeria Police Service Commission. He was appointed Chairman in January 2023 by President Muhammadu Buhari. Arase also served as the 18th Inspector-General of Nigerian Police (IGP) after Suleiman Abba was sacked. Before his appointment as IGP, Arase was head of the topmost intelligence gathering unit of the Nigerian police, the Criminal Intelligence and Investigation Bureau.

Life and career
Arase was born on June 21, 1956 in Owan West Local Government , Edo state in Southern Nigeria. He attended Ahmadu Bello University for his undergraduate studies and graduated with political science degree in 1980. He was recruited into the Nigerian Police a year after on December 1, 1981. He also obtained another bachelor's degree in Law from University of Benin as well as Masters from University of Lagos.

While in Police service, Arase served in various capacities including being Commissioner of Police in Akwa Ibom State as well as serving intelligence gathering unit as Assistant Inspector General. He is a Fellow of the Nigerian Defence Academy and had served in Namibia during the United Nations peacekeeping operation.

Arase retired from the force on June 21, 2016. On June 21, 2016, President Muhammadu Buhari appointed Ibrahim Kpotum Idris as Acting Inspector General of the Nigeria Police Force. After his retirement from Police service, Arase was appointed Chairman of a Task Force responsible for the implementation of a state Anti-Community Development Association Law in Edo State.  

Arase dedicated his post-retirement undertakings to legal practice, Security Consultancy with organizations such as the Office of the National Security Adviser (ONSA), the European Centre for Electoral Support, the Human Rights Centre at the University of Oslo, Public Speaking, Research and other Academic engagements. He is a member of the Committee on Prevention of Torture, Geneva Switzerland currently developing a universal protocol on Investigative Techniques. On January 24, 2023 Arase was appointed Chairman of the Nigeria Police Service Commission by President Muhammadu Buhari.

Awards
In October 2022, a Nigerian national honour of Commander of the Order of the Federal Republic (CFR) was conferred on him by President Muhammadu Buhari.

References

Nigerian police officers
People from Delta State
People from Edo State
Ahmadu Bello University alumni
1956 births
Living people